The A.L.F.A. 12 HP was the second car produced by ALFA, a manufacturer who would later become Alfa Romeo.

The car was launched in the markets following the success of the 24 HP, first car made by A.L.F.A. It was a smaller car with a four-cylinder engine, 2,413 cc of displacement and 22 hp of power at 2,100 rpm (12 HP in model name referred instead to the fiscal horsepower. Bore and stroke were, respectively, . The engine was at the front, while the traction was at the back. It had a four speed gearbox and drum brakes. Both engine and body were derived from 24 HP model. It was designed by Giuseppe Merosi.

Notes

Bibliography 
 
 

15andnbsp;HP
Brass Era vehicles
Cars introduced in 1910